"Lunch Money" is a song by American hip hop recording artist Pusha T. "Lunch Money" is produced by Kanye West. On November 19, 2014, the song was officially released as the album's first official single by G.O.O.D. Music and Def Jam Recordings. On December 16, 2014, the music video was released for "Lunch Money"; it was directed by Emil Nava.

Music video 
The music video for "Lunch Money" was directed by Emil Nava. In the video, a sting operation unveils a ton of unexpected surveillance footage. The footage intermixes moments of dancers having fun with eerie shots.

Track listing

Critical and commercial reception 
The track picked up praise from publications such as Rolling Stone, with the song described as having a "druggy, psychedelic haze" to it.

References 

2013 songs
Songs written by Pusha T
GOOD Music singles
Def Jam Recordings singles
2014 songs
Pusha T songs
Songs written by Kanye West
Song recordings produced by Kanye West